Carl Gustav Swensson (also spelled Svensson; 15 June 1861 – 13 April 1910) was a Swedish landscape architect.

Biography 
Swensson was born in Jönköping and educated by his father, Anders Gustaf Svensson. In 1880 or 1881 he moved to Würzburg, Germany, where he worked until 1887 as an assistant of the city gardener Jöns Persson Lindahl. In 1887 he moved to Vienna, the capital of Austria. From 1891 he worked in Rüschlikon, Switzerland, and then again in Vienna. In today's Slovakia, in 1891, he implemented a project for a park around the Hungarian Wool Fabric, Military Clothing and Blankets Factory in Žilina (German: Ungarische Wollwaren, Militärtuch- und Deckenfabrik Actiengesellschaft in Sillein). After 1900, he was primarily designing the parks in the spa town Mariánské Lázně. Since 1906, he worked in the territory of the nowadays Slovenia for the family Pongratz. He designed the park around the Zora Villa in Bled and of Šenek Mansion in Polzela. He also designed the park of Maruševec Mansion in Varaždin.

Swensson received numerous prizes for his work. In 2000, a memorial plaque was unveiled to him in Bled. In 2021, the largest monument dedicated to Carl Gustav Sensson was unveiled in Žilina, Slovakia.

Carl Gustav Swensson park 

In 2021, 160 years passed since the birth of Carl Gustav Swensson and also 130 years since the establishment of the park around the Hungarian Wool Fabric, Military Clothing and Blankets Factory. As this is so far the only confirm and also the only surviving work of this architect in the whole territory of the Slovak Republic, the Town Council in Žilina, by its resolution, approved the naming of the nameless park located near by Kysucká and Športová streets as the Carl Gustav Swensson Park. The initiative to rename the park was initiated by NGO Servare et Manere, which interpreted the results of historical research by Marek Sobola to the Town Council of Žilina. The current park partially occupies the area of Swensson's original conception and has been enriched with an assortment of rarer and rarer tree species, which forms a small exhibition of trees in the country. The current renovation of the park was designed by landscape architect Marek Sobola.

Carl Gustav Swensson Memorial 
The largest memorial dedicated to Carl Gustav Swensson in the world and in Europe is located in the park of the same name in Žilina, Slovakia. At the initiative of the NGO Servare et Manere, the town of Žilina decided to finance the Carl Gustav Swensson Memorial, which the NGO also built. The Memorial is located in a park with the same name and its authors are landscape architect and artist Marek Sobola and sculptor Michal Janiga. Ján Janík provided overall technical documentation and design of information panels located in the park. The Memorial project was carried out under the official auspices of the Embassy of the Kingdom of Sweden in Vienna.

Gallery

References 

1861 births
1910 deaths
Swedish architects
Swedish landscape architects